Soesiladeepakius is a spider genus of the jumping spider family, Salticidae.

The type species S. aschnae is only known from male specimens. These are 2.4 mm long, with a brown carapace.

Validity
The genus describer Dewanand Makhan publishes in the Australian journal Calodema, whose editor seems to have no quality standards whatsoever, while comparing scientists in general with Hitler and Stalin. While Makhan's work on ants and beetles is substandard (describing existing species without knowledge of the fundamental literature), Soesiladeepakius seems to have been accepted by the arachnologist community, with six species having been added by Ruiz & Maddison in 2012.

Name
The genus is a combination of the given names Soesila and Deepak, the wife and son of the describer. The type species is named after the describer's daughter Aschna.

Species
 Soesiladeepakius arthrostylus Ruiz & Maddison, 2012 — Brazil
 Soesiladeepakius aschnae Makhan, 2007 — Suriname
 Soesiladeepakius biarmatus Ruiz & Maddison, 2012 — Brazil
 Soesiladeepakius gasnieri Ruiz & Maddison, 2012 — Brazil
 Soesiladeepakius lyra Ruiz & Maddison, 2012 — Brazil
 Soesiladeepakius retroversus Ruiz & Maddison, 2012 — Brazil
 Soesiladeepakius uncinatus Ruiz & Maddison, 2012 — Brazil

See also
 Rishaschia
 Soesilarishius

References

Salticidae
Salticidae genera
Fauna of Brazil
Spiders of South America